Naples is a census-designated place (CDP) in the town of Naples in Cumberland County, Maine, United States. The population of the CDP was 428 at the 2010 census.

It is part of the Portland–South Portland–Biddeford, Maine Metropolitan Statistical Area.

Geography

U.S. Route 302 passes through Naples, heading northwest to Bridgton and southeast to Windham and Portland.  Maine State Route 11 intersects US 302, heading south to the western shore of Sebago Lake and northeast towards Poland and Mechanic Falls. Maine State Route 35 leaves US 302 in Naples and heads north to Harrison.

Demographics

References

Census-designated places in Maine
Portland metropolitan area, Maine